Fadiman is a surname. Notable people with the surname include:

Anne Fadiman (born 1953), American writer and journalist
Clifton Fadiman (1904–1999), American editor, writer, radio host and television personality
Dorothy Fadiman (born 1939), American film director
James Fadiman (born 1939), American psychologist and writer
Maria Fadiman (born 1969), American botanist